John Eng (born 1942) is an American former politician in the state of Washington. He served the 37th district from 1973 to 1983.

References

Living people
1942 births
Democratic Party members of the Washington House of Representatives